Thomas Flatman (21 February 1635 – 8 December 1688) was an English poet and miniature painter. There were several editions of his Poems and Songs (1674). One of his self-portraits is in the Victoria and Albert Museum. A portrait of Charles II is in the Wallace Collection, London. His miniatures are noted for their vitality.

Life
Flatman was the son of a clerk in Chancery and was born in Aldersgate Street and educated at Winchester College. He went on to study at New College, Oxford. He was later called to the bar in 1662 although he seems never to have practiced as a lawyer. He was a staunch Royalist and one of his poems was to celebrate the return of Charles II in 1660 after the collapse of the Cromwellian Commonwealth.

Among his earliest verses are lines prefixed to Graphice (1658) by Sir William Sanderson, a work containing a description of the art of miniature painting, based on Edward Norgate's writings. Flatman divided his career between writing poetry (in which his earnest religious temperament is revealed) and painting portraits in miniature. A versatile man, he was made a Fellow of the newly founded Royal Society in 1668. A number of his friends were leading clergymen, and many of his sitters were drawn from the Church and other intellectual circles.

Alexander Chalmers attributes the satirical work Don Juan Lamberto, or a Comical History of the late Times  to Flatman in his entry in the General Biographical Dictionary of 1812–1817.

References

External links 
 
 Portrait of Sir John King in the Royal Collection
 Engraving of Thomas Flatman by William Richardson in the National Portrait Gallery
 Self-portrait in the National Portrait Gallery
 Poem: Advice To An Old Man of Sixty Three About To Marry a Girle of Sixteen
 Poem: The Batchelor's Song
 Poem: The Sad Day
 19th century biographical entry by Alexander Chalmers
 

1635 births
1688 deaths
17th-century English painters
English male painters
English portrait painters
Portrait miniaturists
Fellows of the Royal Society
Alumni of New College, Oxford
English male poets